A large number of monuments were erected in Germany in honour of Emperor William I (known in German as Kaiser-Wilhelm-Denkmal). As early as 1867 the Berlin sculptor, Friedrich Drake, had created the first equestrian statue, that portrayed William I as the King of Prussia. To date the Prussian Monument Institute (Preußische Denkmal-Institut) has recorded:
 63 equestrian statues
 231 standing statues
 5 seated statues and
 126 busts

that were created and erected between 1888 and 1918 in the German-speaking region. In addition there are numerous William I monuments on which the emperor is portrayed in a relief medallion or which commemorates the emperor in a dedicatory inscription. During the  "imperial era" 28 Emperor William I towers were also built. 

They are most commonly known in English sources as Emperor William monuments or Kaiser Wilhelm monuments.

History 
A distinction must be made between two groups of monuments:

 those erected in honour of William I of Prussia (22 March 1797 – 9 March 1888), who was proclaimed German Emperor during the Franco-Prussian War of  1870/71 in the Hall of Mirrors at Versailles on the initiative of Bismarck, and
 those in honour of his grandson, William II (27 January 1859; – 4 June 1941), who had to abdicate at the end of the First World War in November 1918.

Even before the imperial period it was customary in Prussia not to erect monuments to living monarchs. Moreover, before official monuments of members of the royal house, i.e. Prussia, could be built, a so-called 'sovereign approval' had to be sought. As a result, almost all Emperor William monuments appeared only after the death of Emperor William I in 1888. There are very few monuments to the last German Emperor, William II, for the reasons mentioned above. The only two equestrian statues are in Cologne (a free-standing monument on the Hohenzollern Bridge) and in Wuppertal's Elberfeld district (a 3/4 scale relief).

Emperor William monuments were mainly built in Prussia and in larger cities outside of Prussia, usually on the initiative of private individuals. The organization of finance, tendering, planning and unveiling was carried out by memorial committees that were dissolved after completion of the monument.

The best known surviving Emperor William monuments today are the 81-metre-high Kyffhäuser Monument (1890-1896), The Emperor William Monument at Porta Westfalica, unveiled in 1896, and the monument at the Deutsches Eck in Koblenz erected in 1897. All three were designed by Berlin architect, Bruno Schmitz. 

The first (still surviving) monument to William I, which portrays him as King of Prussia on horseback, stands at the bridgehead of Cologne's Hohenzollern Bridge (right bank, i.e. on the Deutz side).

The only monument showing Emperor William I in civilian clothes, stands in the spa park at Bad Ems. It was unveiled on 7 May 1893 and portrays the monarch as people saw him when he was visiting the spa in the town. 

One of the 231 statues of Emperor William I was unveiled in 1894 in Wiesbaden. The monument, with a height of 6.8 metres, had been created by Dresden sculptor, Johannes Schilling, and bore the inscription "The grateful city of Wiesbaden" on its base. 

The last official monument was the equestrian statue "for" Lübeck: the authorization and contract award were issued in 1914; although the die was ready for casting, no bronze was available because of the First World War. So the statue was only completed in 1919.

Gallery

See also 
 Bismarck monuments
 Kaiser towers
 Kaiser Wilhelm Tower

German Empire
 
Monuments and memorials in Germany
Outdoor sculptures in Germany
Equestrian statues in Germany
Sculptures of men in Germany